Linyuan District is a suburban district of Kaohsiung, Taiwan. It has 68,459 inhabitants in January 2023. It is the southernmost district of the city.

History
The prehistory era of the district can be traced back to the artifacts found at the Fengbitou Archaeological Site.

Ming Dynasty
The district used to be the administrative, commercial and cultural center of Xiaozhu Li during the Ming Dynasty.

Qing Dynasty
During the Qing Dynasty, Xiaozhu Li was renamed Xiaozhu Upper Li and Xiaozhu Lower Li.

Republic of China
After the handover of Taiwan from Japan to the Republic of China in 1945, Linyuan was organized as a rural township of Kaohsiung County. On 25 December 2010, Kaohsiung County was merged with Kaohsiung City and Linyuan was upgraded to a district of the city.

Geography
This district is part of Kaohsiung built up area which encompasses 10 cities (or districts) out of 18 in official Kaohsiung Metro Area.

Administrative divisions
The district consists of Beishan, Dingcuo, Fengyun, Gangpu, Gangzui, Gongcuo, Guangying, Linjia, Linnei, Linyuan, Renai, Tantou, Tunglin, Tungshan, Wanggong, Wenxian, Wufu, Xishan, Xixi, Xizhou, Zhongcuo, Zhongmen, Zhongshan and Zhongyun Village.

Tourist attractions
 Cingshueiyan Scenic Area
 Cingshuei Temple (清水寺), founded in 1666
 Fengbitou Archaeological Site
 Fongshan Reservoir
 Former Dinglinzihbian Police Station
 Fude Temple (福德廟), founded in 1749
 Guangying Temple (廣應廟), founded in 1787
 Huang Family Historical Residence
 Huang Fong-an Drugstore
 Linyuan Cingshueiyan Former Japanese Military Tunnel
 Linyuan Ocean Wetland Park
 Linyuan Old Street
 Old Police Department
 Shuangyuan Bridge
 Sinji Temple (興濟宮), founded in 1661
 Yishihyuan Herb Garden

See also
 Kaohsiung

References

External links

 

Districts of Kaohsiung